Teşkan (also, Teshkan and Tashkyand) is a village in the Yardymli Rayon of Azerbaijan.  The village forms part of the municipality of Separadi.

References 

Populated places in Yardimli District